Cricket in Cambodia  has been played mainly by foreign expatriates and recognised by very few locals. Recent promotion of the sport has seen a growth in its popularity and the formation of clubs and associations.

A cricket club has existed at some stage in Cambodia's capital Phnom Penh, the Phnom Penh Cricket Club. This team has competed against other nearby Asian cricket clubs, including a club based in Singapore. This club was involved with successful sport's club Phnom Penh Crown, widely known for their football team, but often branching out into other games. Another club was formed in 1999.  This club was formed by mostly Indian and Sri Lankan expatriates, where they competed amongst themselves on a regular basis.

The Cambodia Cricket Association was launched in 2011. Cambodia cricket expects to receive funding from the Asian Cricket Council. A cricket coach from Afghanistan, Ruhaan Dharmesh Shah and his assistant coach from Pakistan, Spandan Gautam Pandya  will be visiting Cambodia for the next three years promoting the sport. There are sufficient expatriate cricketers who have resided in Cambodia long enough to qualify to field a national side. The Phnom Penh Cricket Club was re-established in 2012 and is introducing the game to schools.  It has an over-16 team and a junior squad which has 99 percent local members. Former Indian international Ajit Agarkar was named as the head coach of the Phnom Penh Cricket Club in 2012, he also contributed in developing Cambodia's national cricket team.

2022 saw the announcement of the inclusion of cricket in the upcoming 2023 Southeast Asian Games to be hosted in Cambodia the following year, Cambodia being awarded ICC Associate membership status, the inclusion of cricket in Cambodia's National Games, a series of friendly matches in Singapore for the national men's team, and the national women's team's first WT20I international matches, a 6-game series against the Philippines.

References